Duran Jrake Stanley (born November 29, 1990) is a Honduran-American soccer player.  He was born in Roatán, Honduras, and currently plays for Ventura County Fusion in the USL Pro.

External links
 USL Pro profile

1990 births
Living people
Orange County SC players
OC Pateadores Blues players
Ventura County Fusion players
USL Championship players
USL League Two players
People from Roatán
Honduran footballers
Association football forwards
Honduran emigrants to the United States